Rodica may refer to:

A Romanian female given name:
Rodica Florea
Rodica Mateescu
Rodica Petrescu
Rodica Popescu Bitănescu
Rodica Ramer
Rodica Stănoiu
Rodica Şerban

In Slovenia:
Rodica, a settlement in the Municipality of Domžale
Little Mount Rodica (Mala Rodica), a 1836 m mountain in the Julian Alps, northwestern Slovenia
Rodica Hill, a 307 m hill in Rodica, Domžale
Mount Rodica, a 1966 m mountain in the Julian Alps, northwestern Slovenia
Mount Suha Rodica, a 1944 m mountain in the Julian Alps, northwestern Slovenia

Romanian feminine given names